USS R-26 (SS-103) was an R-class coastal and harbor defense submarine built for the United States Navy during World War I.

Description
The R-boats built by Lake Torpedo Boat Company (R-21 through R-27) are sometimes considered a separate class from those of the other builders. They displaced  on the surface and  submerged. The R-class submarines had a crew of 3 officers and 23 enlisted men.

For surface running, the boats were powered by two  diesel engines, each driving one propeller shaft. When submerged each propeller was driven by a  electric motor. They could reach  on the surface and  underwater.

The boats were armed with four 21-inch (53.3 cm) torpedo tubes in the bow. They carried four reloads, for a total of eight torpedoes. The R-class submarines were also armed with a single 3"/50 caliber deck gun.

Construction and career
R-26 was laid down 26 April 1917 by the Lake Torpedo Boat Company in Bridgeport, Connecticut. She was launched on 18 June 1919 sponsored by Mrs. J. Walter Barnett, and commissioned on 23 October 1919. Homeported at Coco Solo in the Panama Canal Zone, R-26 departed New London, Connecticut, on 26 November 1919 and arrived in the Canal Zone 11 January 1920. Given hull classification symbol SS-103 in July, she spent her entire career operating out of Coco Solo. Interrupting her service in those waters only for overhauls at Balboa and on the East Coast, she returned to the United States for inactivation in January 1925. Arriving at Philadelphia, Pennsylvania, on 25 January, she was decommissioned on 12 June after only five-and-a-half years of service. She was berthed at League Island until struck from the Naval Vessel Register in May 1930. Her hull was sold for scrapping in July of that year.

Notes

References

External links
 

Ships built in Bridgeport, Connecticut
United States R-class submarines
1919 ships